(The) Open Door(s) Most often refers to the Open Door Policy, an international policy around 1900 regarding keeping China open to trade to all nations; The term is often applied in international trade policy. There are numerous other uses:

Real estate
Opendoor, a popular online real estate buyer and seller

Schools 
 Open Door Christian Academy, Troutdale, Oregon, U.S.
 Open Door Christian School (Elyria, Ohio)
 Open Door Alternate School, a school in School District 22 Vernon, British Columbia, Canada

Literature
 The Open Door (Latifa al-Zayyat novel) (1961)
 The Open Door (Sillitoe novel) (1989)
 Open Door Series, an Irish adult literacy book series
 "The Open Door", a story by Margaret Oliphant

Film
 The Open Door (1957 film), a Spanish film by César Fernández Ardavín
 The Open Door (1963 film), an Egyptian film by Henry Barakat
 Open Doors (film) (Porte aperte), a 1990 Italian film
 The Open Doors, a 2004 British short film based on a Saki short story
 The Open Door (2008 film), an American horror film with Catherine Munden
 The Open Door, a 1913 short film by Edward Barker with Tom Chatterton
 The Open Door, a 1914 short film with Alberto Capozzi
 The Open Door (2016 film), a 2016 Spanish film with Carmen Machi
 Open Door (2019 film), a 2019 Albanian film by Florenc Papas with Luli Bitri

Television
 Open Door (TV programme), a British television programme produced by the BBC's Community Programme Unit that debuted in 1973
 Jacqueline Susann's Open Door, a 1951 American talk show
 Otvorena vrata or Open Door, a Serbian TV series

Music 
 The Open Door, a 2006 album by Evanescence
 Open Doors (album), an album by Nigerian Gospel musician Nosa
 "Open Door", a song by Genesis from their 1980 album, Duke
 The Open Door EP, a 2009 EP by Death Cab for Cutie
 "Open Door" (song), a 2012 song by Attaloss
 Open Doors, a 2002 EP by Brandi Carlile

Other uses
 Open Doors, a non-denominational Christian mission
 Open Door, Buenos Aires, a town in Luján Partido, Argentina
 Open-door academic policy, a university admissions policy
 Open Door Children's Home, Rome, Georgia, U.S.
 Open Door Council, a 1926-1965 British organisation pressing for equal economic opportunities for women
 Open door policy (business) the managerial practice of encouraging openness and transparency with the employees.

See also
 Doors open